Garrufo  is a frazione  in the Province of Teramo in the Abruzzo region of Italy. Located in Val Vibrata, where urban development is very recent.  Garrufo is located west of the capital city,

Frazioni of the Province of Teramo